Jutulhogget may refer to
 Jutulhogget (Hedmark), a canyon in Alvdal and Rendalen, Norway
 Jutulhogget (Oppland), a canyon in Rondane, Norway
 Jutulhogget (Antarctica), a peak of Jutulsessen in Queen Maud Land